Tierra de Pasiones (Land of Passions) is a Spanish-language telenovela produced by Telemundo which is owned by NBC Universal. Tierra de Pasiones was filmed on a set in Homestead, Florida, and aired weekdays from February 20, 2006 to October 24, 2006 at 8 pm ET.

Plot
In a beautiful valley where the most exquisite grapes are farmed, an intense and sizzling love story will flourish between Valeria San Roman, a beautiful woman with a strong character, which has given her the strength to face life's deceptions, and Francisco Contreras, renowned publisher, widower and a man of will.

Valeria, who manages the San Roman vineyard, hasn’t had an easy life. Her own father, Jose Maria 'Chema' San Roman, the family's patriarch, has always hated her because she is the only one who doesn’t obey him. A man without scruples, selfish and womanizing, Chema arrived to the United States, married Valeria's mom to steal everything from her and later disposed of her. If that weren’t enough, Chema schemes a hideous plan causing Valeria to experience a horrible betrayal.

Meanwhile, Francisco arrives to visit his father at the ranch only to learn that he has married Marcia, a woman much younger than he who leads him to the brink of bankruptcy and drives him to suicide. At that time, Francisco decides to stay in the valley and save the family business from bankruptcy.

When Valeria and Francisco meet, their strong personalities undoubtedly clash, although it is evident that there is a strong chemistry between them. They team up to form a partnership convenient to both and are resigned to the idea of having to put up with each other. As they get to know one another, a love stems between them that will survive all the challenges they will encounter along the way.

But, when destiny finally gives Valeria this new opportunity, Pablo, an old flame she thought was dead, comes back from the past to change everything.

Cast

Main Cast in Order of Appearance

Crew

Broadcasters

References

External links
Telemundo Website
Official "Tierra de Pasiones" Website

2006 telenovelas
2006 American television series debuts
2006 American television series endings
Spanish-language American telenovelas
Telemundo telenovelas